Pelin Gündeş Bakır (born March 13, 1972 in Kadıköy) is a Turkish politician and a professor at Istanbul Technical University. She was elected to Parliament in the 2011 general election as a Justice and Development Party (AK Party) deputy.

External links
Profile at Istanbul Technical University 
Twitter account

References

1972 births
Living people
People from Kadıköy
Justice and Development Party (Turkey) politicians
Deputies of Kayseri
KU Leuven alumni
Istanbul Technical University alumni
Alumni of Imperial College London
Yıldız Technical University alumni
Turkish civil engineers
Members of the 24th Parliament of Turkey
21st-century Turkish women politicians